Tylomelania wallacei is a species of freshwater snail with an operculum, an aquatic gastropod mollusk in the family Pachychilidae.

Distribution 
This species occurs in Maros karst, Sulawesi, Indonesia.

Ecology 
Tylomelania wallacei is a riverine species.

References

External links 
  Sarasin P. & Sarasin F. (1898). Die Süßwassermollusken von Celebes. Band 1. In: Sarasin P. & Sarasin F. (1898–1901). Materialien zur Naturgeschichte der Insel Celebes. Kreidel's Verlag, Wiesbaden. 26-27, table 3, figure 27; tab. 5, fig. 68; tab. 6, fig. 93.

wallacei
Gastropods described in 1860